Frédéric Cabrolier is a French politician from the National Rally.

He is a FN regional councillor in Midi-Pyrénées. In 2009, he was selected to be National Front's candidate in Midi-Pyrénées for the 2010 regional elections.

He was elected Member of Parliament for Tarn's 1st constituency in the 2022 French legislative election, defeating incumbent MP Muriel Roques-Étienne.

References

Year of birth missing (living people)
Living people
National Rally (France) politicians
Place of birth missing (living people)
Deputies of the 16th National Assembly of the French Fifth Republic